Ilica may refer to:

 Ilica (street), one of the best known streets in downtown Zagreb, Croatia
 Ilıca (disambiguation), several places in Turkey